Blucium or Bloukion was a fortress of the Tolistoboii in ancient Galatia. It was the residence of Deiotarus, in defence of whom Cicero made an oration, addressed to the Dictator Caesar. In the text of Cicero, the name is read Luceium, and, accordingly, some translators amend Strabo by writing Λούκειον. 

Its site is located near Karalar, Asiatic Turkey.

References

Populated places in ancient Galatia
Former populated places in Turkey
Roman towns and cities in Turkey
History of Ankara Province